Edwin LeRoy Fjordbotten (November 4, 1938  June 8, 2017) was a Canadian provincial level politician, farmer and auctioneer. He served as cabinet minister in the government of Alberta serving various portfolios from 1982 to 1992. He held as seat in the Legislative Assembly of Alberta as an MLA in the governing Progressive Conservative caucus from 1979 to 1993.

Political career
Fjordbotten first ran for a seat to the Alberta Legislature as a Progressive Conservative candidate for the 1979 Alberta general election. He won a sizable majority defeating three other candidates to hold the electoral district of Macleod for the Progressive Conservatives. He was re-elected in the 1982 Alberta general election winning a landslide and defeating five other candidates.

After his convincing re-election win Fjordbotten was appointed to his first position in the Executive Council of Alberta as Minister of Agriculture. He would serve that post for most of his second term in office. He would become Minister of Tourism after Don Getty became premier of the province. Fjordbotten would handily win his third term winning a three-way race in the 1986 Alberta general election. He held his cabinet post for less than a year after the election before being promoted to be the new Minister of Forestry, Lands and Wildlife. He retained that cabinet post after he was re-elected in the 1989 Alberta general election. When Ralph Klein became premier in 1992 Fjordbotten was not part of the new cabinet. He did not run again for re-election when the assembly was dissolved in 1993. He died in June 2017 at the age of 78.

References

External links
Legislative Assembly of Alberta Members Listing

1938 births
2017 deaths
Progressive Conservative Association of Alberta MLAs
Members of the Executive Council of Alberta